The 2021 New Zealand Grand Prix event for open wheel racing cars was held at Hampton Downs Motorsport Park in northern Waikato on 24 January 2021. It was the sixty-sixth New Zealand Grand Prix and fielded Toyota Racing Series cars. The event also served as the third race of the first round of the 2021 Toyota Racing Series. The race was won by Shane van Gisbergen, who started his race from the pit-lane as a result of a fire-extinguisher issue pre-race.

Report

Qualifying

Race

References

New Zealand Grand Prix
New Zealand Grand Prix
New Zealand Grand Prix